Pasil is a 5th class municipality in the southwestern part of the Kalinga. It is bounded on the north by the municipality of Balbalan, on the south by the municipality of Tinglayan, on the east by Tabuk city, and on the west by the province of Abra and south-western part of the municipality of Sadanga, Mountain Province. According to the 2020 census, it has a population of 10,577 people.

Geography

Barangays
Pasil is politically subdivided into 14 barangays. These barangays are headed by elected officials: Barangay Captain, Barangay Council, whose members are called Barangay Councilors. All are elected every three years.

Climate

Demographics

Economy

Government
Pasil, belonging to the lone congressional district of the province of Kalinga, is governed by a mayor designated as its local chief executive and by a municipal council as its legislative body in accordance with the Local Government Code. The mayor, vice mayor, and the councilors are elected directly by the people through an election which is being held every three years.

Elected officials

Folklore
In an earlier time, Kabunian–the supreme deity of the Kalinga–left a drop of water upon an ancient tree he passed on one of his travels. This drop trickled down and with a great force akin to magnetism, attracted nearby brooks and rivulets to form what is now called the Pasil River.

References

External links
 [ Philippine Standard Geographic Code]
Pasil LGU Profile on the Local Governance Performance Management System
Philippine Census Information

Municipalities of Kalinga (province)